1932 Emperor's Cup Final was the 12th final of the Emperor's Cup competition. The final was played at Koshien South Ground in Hyōgo on April 3, 1933. Keio Club won the championship.

Overview
Keio Club won their 1st title, by defeating Yoshino Club 5–1.

Match details

See also
1932 Emperor's Cup

References

Emperor's Cup
1932 in Japanese football